NGC 155 is a lenticular galaxy in the Cetus constellation. It was discovered on September 1, 1886, by Lewis A. Swift.

References

Notes

External links 
 
 SEDS

Astronomical objects discovered in 1886
MCG objects
002076
Cetus (constellation)
0155
Lenticular galaxies